Trichosophroniella rotschildi is a species of beetle in the family Cerambycidae, and the only species in the genus Trichosophroniella. It was described by Breuning in 1959.

References

Desmiphorini
Beetles described in 1959